João Victor Santos Sá (born 27 March 1994), known as João Victor or Victor Sá, is a Brazilian footballer, who plays for Botafogo as a left winger.

Club career
Victor Sá failed a doping test in May 2017, testing positive for isometheptene and was eligible to play after receiving a 6-months ban, expiring on 26 November 2017.

After Oliver Glasner was appointed manager of VfL Wolfsburg, Glasner took Victor Sá with him from LASK Linz to the German club for the 2019/20 season. Victor Sá signed a 4-year contract with VfL Wolfsburg on 10 May 2019.

Victor Sá signed for Al Jazira Club in August 2021.

Honours

Individual
Austrian Cup Top goalscorer: 2016–17, 2018–19

References

External links
 
 

1994 births
People from São José dos Campos
Living people
Brazilian footballers
Clube Atlético Joseense players
Botafogo de Futebol e Regatas players
Kapfenberger SV players
LASK players
VfL Wolfsburg players
Al Jazira Club players
Austrian Football Bundesliga players
2. Liga (Austria) players
Bundesliga players
UAE Pro League players
Campeonato Brasileiro Série A players
Brazilian expatriate footballers
Brazilian expatriate sportspeople in Austria
Expatriate footballers in Austria
Brazilian expatriate sportspeople in Germany
Expatriate footballers in Germany
Brazilian expatriate sportspeople in the United Arab Emirates
Expatriate footballers in the United Arab Emirates
Association football midfielders
Doping cases in association football
Brazilian sportspeople in doping cases
Footballers from São Paulo (state)